On Deck may refer to:
 On-deck, a baseball term. 
 "On Deck" (song), a 2020 song by Abra Cadabra
 OnDeck Capital, a company